"Egoist" is a song by Falco from his eighth studio album Out of the Dark (Into the Light). The song was also released as a single. (Both the album and the single were released posthumously in 1998.)

Background and writing 
The song was written by Falco, Patrick Alexander Ehrlich, and Steve van Velvet. The recording was produced by Torsten Börger.

Commercial performance 
The song reached no. 4 in Germany, no. 6 in Austria and no. 19 in Switzerland.

Track listings 
CD maxi single EMI Electrola 8 85985 2 (EMI) (1998, Netherlands)
 "Egoist" (Remix) (3:40)
 "Egoist" (Original Version) (3:26)
 "Out Of The Dark (Remix) (3:26)

Charts

Year-end charts

References

External links 
 Falco – "Egoist" at Discogs

1998 songs
1998 singles
Falco (musician) songs
Electrola singles
EMI Records singles
Songs written by Falco (musician)